The Panda Bar massacre alternatively known as the Panda Café attack was a false flag attack on Serbian civilians in the city of Peć in north-western Autonomous Province of Kosovo and Metohija, now Kosovo on the night of 14–15 December 1998. Two masked men opened fire into a coffee bar, killing six Serb youths, and wounding 15 others.

The attack came at a time of heightened tensions, when on 14 December the Serbian police ambushed the KLA who were smuggling weapons and supplies from Albania. The Panda Bar attack appeared as a reprisal, and broke the brief cease-fire between the Albanian and Serbian forces during the Kosovo War. The KLA was accused, but did not accept responsibility at the time. Six Albanian young men were arrested and tortured in custody at the time, but acquitted in the trial.

Speculation that the crime may have been committed by the Serbian state security services had been put forward in the past, but the crime remained unsolved as no new evidence had come forward for a long time. Many years after the incident, the Serbian government officially acknowledged that it was perpetrated by agents of the Serbian Secret Service.  Among Kosovo Albanians, the Panda Bar massacre is considered to have been used as a pretext for the attacks of the Serbian army and police against Albanian villages.

Timeline
The attack on the Panda Bar came within hours of a border ambush in which at least 31 fighters from the Kosovo Liberation Army were killed by Serbian troops. That evening, suspected KLA gunmen entered a Serb-owned café in Peja and opened fire on the patrons, killing six Serb youths. The victims were a 14-year-old, a 16-year-old, three 17-year-olds and one 25-year-old. Western diplomats suspected that the attack was carried out by the KLA in retribution for the ambush. The KLA denied responsibility; journalist Tim Judah noted that some of the diplomats thought the attack might have been carried out by a rogue unit.

The shooting appalled foreign emissaries, and at a meeting with Milošević the following day, Holbrooke condemned it as an act of terrorism and described the situation in Kosovo as "very grave". Milošević issued a separate statement accusing the international community of failing to prevent attacks on Serb civilians, stating: "The terrorist gangs have not ceased attacking the army, the police, and inhabitants of Kosovo."

The attack led to an immediate crackdown on the Albanian-populated southern quarters of Peja – Kapešnica and Zatra. The area was sealed off, and houses were searched systematically. Media reports stated that Serbian police killed two Kosovo Albanians during the operation. The OSCE later made a report on the event and its aftermath, calling it the Panda Bar incident.

Six young Albanians were arrested and found guilty of the crime in the aftermath of the event. They were between the ages of 17 to 22. The six men were tortured and one of them confessed to the murder under torture. In the trial they were acquitted as no evidence existed about their involvement. They were convicted to one year in prison each for breaching public order, but were released a month later. Since then, one of them has developed mental health problems which have deteriorated over time. Another one went to become a finance officer at the municipality of Peja.

Investigation

After the massacre, six Albanian young men were rounded by Serbian troops and arrested, and tortured in custody. They were all acquitted in a trial.

An investigation was started in 2011. The grave stones of the victims have been destroyed.

In December 2013, Aleksandar Vučić (now President of Serbia) acknowledged that there is no evidence that murder was committed by Albanians. The Serbian Organised Crime Prosecutor's Office launched a new investigation in 2016 and reached the conclusion that the massacre was not perpetrated by Albanians.

Many years after the incident, the Serbian government officially acknowledged that it was perpetrated by agents of the Serbian Secret Service.

See also
 War crimes in the Kosovo War
 2004 unrest in Kosovo
 False flag

Annotations

References

Sources
Books

Newspaper articles

External links

1998 crimes in Kosovo
1998 mass shootings in Europe
1998 murders in Europe
20th-century mass murder in Europe
Anti-Serbian sentiment
Attacks on bars in Europe
Attacks on buildings and structures in 1998
December 1998 crimes
December 1998 events in Europe
Kosovo Liberation Army
Kosovo Serbs
Massacres in 1998
Mass shootings in Kosovo
Massacres in the Kosovo War
Massacres of Serbs
Mass shootings in Serbia
Peja
Terrorist incidents in Europe in 1998
Terrorist incidents in Serbia